Börje Nilsson can refer to:

 Börje Nilsson (footballer), a Swedish footballer
 Börje Nilsson (sport shooter), a Swedish Olympic sport shooter